Cuckoo is the second studio album by English alternative rock band Curve. It was released on 13 September 1993 and was issued by Anxious Records and Charisma Records. A musically more varied but significantly darker release than Curve's 1992 debut album Doppelgänger, Cuckoo was less commercially successful than the band's previous releases.

Release
Cuckoo was released in the United Kingdom on 13 September 1993 by Anxious Records, and in the United States on 21 September 1993 by Anxious and Charisma Records. Two singles were issued from the album: "Blackerthreetracker" (which featured the Cuckoo song "Missing Link" as its lead track) on 23 August 1993, and "Superblaster" on 8 November 1993. In the UK, Cuckoo underperformed commercially compared to previous Curve releases, peaking at number 23 on the UK Albums Chart. Several months after the album's release, Curve disbanded, though they would reform in 1996.

In the August 1996 issue of Select magazine, Curve frontwoman Toni Halliday said: "I still think our second album was our best. It got to the point where Dean didn't want to tour. We did reach that point of hedonistic head-fuckery, glugging JD, hollering 'Where's the schnozz?' You finally get that out of your system and think, 'This is sad.' We couldn't have gone on like that."

Track listing

Personnel
Credits are adapted from the album's liner notes.

Curve
 Dean Garcia – bass, guitar, drum programming
 Toni Halliday – vocals

Additional musicians
 Flood – electronics
 Sally Herbert – violin on "Superblaster" and "Left of Mother"
 Alex Mitchell – guitar
 Steve Monti – drums on "Crystal", "Superblaster" and "Sweetest Pie"
 Alan Moulder – guitar
 Steve Osborne – guitar
 Debbie Smith – guitar

Production
 Darren Allison – mixing (assistant)
 Curve – production
 Flood – production
 Alan Moulder – mixing
 Steve Osborne – production on "Unreadable Communication", "Turkey Crossing" and "Cuckoo"

Design
 Andrew Catlin – band photography
 Flat Earth – sleeve design, cover photography
 Vaughan Matthews – cover photography

Charts

References

External links
 
 

1993 albums
Curve (band) albums
Albums produced by Flood (producer)
Albums produced by Steve Osborne
Charisma Records albums